This was the first edition of the tournament as a Challenger event.

Harri Heliövaara and Emil Ruusuvuori won the title after defeating Jesper de Jong and Ryan Nijboer 6–3, 6–4 in the final.

Seeds

Draw

References

External links
 Main draw

Dutch Open - Doubles
2019 Dutch Open (tennis)